Sadwavirus is a genus of viruses in the order Picornavirales, in the family Secoviridae. Plants (specifically Satsuma mandarin trees) serve as natural hosts. There are three subgenera and five species in this genus. Diseases associated with this genus include: satsuma dwarf virus disease which causes spoon-shaped leaves on citrus tree. Symptoms are enations, multiple flushing, stunting or dwarfing, reduction in number and size of leaves and fruits. The name of this genus comes from one of its species: Satsuma dwarf virus.

Taxonomy
The following subgenera and species are recognized:
 Cholivirus
 Chocolate lily virus A
 Dioscorea mosaic associated virus
 Satsumavirus
 Satsuma dwarf virus
 Stramovirus
 Black raspberry necrosis virus
 Strawberry mottle virus

Structure
Viruses in Sadwavirus are non-enveloped, with icosahedral geometries, and T=pseudo3 symmetry. The diameter is around 25-30 nm.
The genome is segmented into two parts of linear, positive-sense, single-stranded RNA, 11000-12000 nucleotides in length, where one segment is about 7kb and the second segment is 4.6 to 5.4kb.

Life cycle
Viral replication is cytoplasmic, and is lysogenic. Entry into the host cell is achieved by penetration into the host cell. Replication follows the positive stranded RNA virus replication model. Positive stranded RNA virus transcription is the method of transcription. The virus exits the host cell by tubule-guided viral movement.
Plants serve as the natural host. The virus is transmitted via a vector (but not SMOV). Transmission routes are vector, seed borne, and grafting.

References

External links
 Viralzone: Sadwavirus
 ICTV
 UniProt Taxonomy 

Secoviridae
Virus genera